James "Jimmy" Sanderson is a Scottish curler.

He is also 1978 Scottish Mixed Curling champion.

Teams

Men's

Mixed

References

External links
 

Living people
Scottish male curlers
Scottish curling champions
Year of birth missing (living people)